Nigel Geoffrey Stocks (born 6 September 1964) is an engineer and physicist, notable for discovering suprathreshold stochastic resonance (SSR) and its application to cochlear implant technology.

Education
He attended Bingley Grammar School before received a BSc in Applied Physics and Electronics (1987) and a PhD in (1991), under Peter V. E. McClintock, at Lancaster University, UK, with a thesis entitled Experiments in Stochastic Nonlinear Dynamics.

Career
His early research work was undertaken in the Lancaster Nonlinear Group and focused on the development of the theory of nonequilibrium dynamical systems and, in particular, on stochastic resonance. Stocks moved to the University of Warwick in 1993 where he joined the Fluid Dynamics Research Centre and undertook studies on transition to turbulence. In 1996 he was awarded a TMR EU Fellowship and worked with Riccardo Mannella at Pisa University before subsequently returning to Warwick as a University of Warwick Research Fellow. He was promoted to Senior Lecturer in 2002, Reader in 2005, and full Professor in 2007. Stocks' research interests are in the general area of stochastic nonlinear systems and biomimetics. In particular, his research has focused on neural coding mechanisms for cochlear implants and the development of biomimetic signal processing techniques. In 2012 he was appointed Head of the School of Engineering at the University of Warwick - one of the UK's largest integrated Schools of Engineering.

Scientific genealogy
Stocks' scientific genealogy runs as follows:

 1768, MD, University of Tübingen, Johann Friedrich Gmelin
 1783, Medicinae Dr., University of Göttingen, Georg Friedrich Hildebrandt
 1800, PhD, University of Erlangen-Nuremberg, Johann Salomo Christoph Schweigger
 1827, Philosophiae Dr., University of Wittenberg, Wilhelm Eduard Weber
 1863, Dr. rer. nat., University of Göttingen, Friedrich Wilhelm Georg Kohlrausch
 1887, Dr. rer. nat., University of Würzburg, Walther Hermann Nernst
 1922, Dr. Phil, University of Berlin, Franz Eugen Simon
 1931, Dr. Phil, University of Berlin, Kurt Alfred Georg Mendelssohn
 1952, DPhil, University of Oxford, Harold Max Rosenberg
 1966, DPhil, University of Oxford, Peter Vaughan Elsmere McClintock
 1991, PhD, University of Lancaster, Nigel Geoffrey Stocks

Books by Stocks
 Mark D. McDonnell, Nigel G. Stocks, Charles E. M. Pearce, and Derek Abbott, Stochastic Resonance, Cambridge University Press, 2008, .

See also
 Stochastic resonance
 Suprathreshold stochastic resonance
 Stochastic Resonance (book)

Notes

External links
 Stocks' homepage
 Stocks' math genealogy

1964 births
Living people
Engineers from Bradford
Alumni of Lancaster University
English physicists
People from Warwick
Academics of the University of Warwick
Probability theorists